The 23rd annual Venice International Film Festival was held from 25 August to 8 September 1962.

Orson Welles initially planned to premiere The Trial at the festival, but the film was not completed in time. 

The biggest hit of the festival was a retrospective of the American Twenties.

Jury
 Luigi Chiarini (Italy) (head of jury)
 Guglielmo Biraghi (Italy)  
 G. B. Cavallaro (Italy)
 Georges Charensol (France)
 Iosif Kheifits (Soviet Union)
 John Houseman (USA)
 Arturo Lanocita (Italy)
 Ronald Neame (UK)
 Hans Schaarwächter (West Germany)

Films in competition

Awards
Golden Lion:
Family Diary (Valerio Zurlini)
Ivan's Childhood (Andrei Tarkovsky)
Special Jury Prize:
My Life to Live (Jean-Luc Godard)
Volpi Cup:
 Best Actor - Burt Lancaster - (Birdman of Alcatraz)
 Best Actress - Emmanuelle Riva  - (Thérèse Desqueyroux)
Best First Work
David and Lisa (Frank Perry)
Los inundados (Fernando Birri)
New Cinema Award
A Man for Burning (Valentino Orsini, Paolo and Vittorio Taviani)
San Giorgio Prize
Birdman of Alcatraz (John Frankenheimer)
FIPRESCI Prize
Knife in the Water (Roman Polanski)
OCIC Award
Term of Trial (Peter Glenville)
Pasinetti Award
My Life to Live (Jean-Luc Godard)
Parallel Sections - A Man for Burning (Valentino Orsini, Paolo and Vittorio Taviani)
Italian Cinema Clubs Award
Mamma Roma (Pier Paolo Pasolini)
Award of the City of Imola
A Milanese Story (Eriprando Visconti)
Special Mention - Pelle viva (Giuseppe Fina)
Award of the City of Venice
Family Diary (Valerio Zurlini)
Catholic Cinema Clubs Award
Family Diary (Valerio Zurlini)
Cinema 60 Award
A Man for Burning (Valentino Orsini, Paolo and Vittorio Taviani)

References

External links
 
 Venice Film Festival 1962 Awards on IMDb

Venice International Film Festival
Venice International Film Festival
Venice Film Festival
Film
Venice International Film Festival
Venice International Film Festival